KRMS-LD (channel 32) is a low-power television station licensed to Lake Ozark, Missouri, United States, serving the Lake of the Ozarks region and the southern portion of the Columbia–Jefferson City television market as an affiliate of Cozi TV. It is owned by Viper Communications alongside radio stations KRMS (1150 AM) and KRMS-FM (93.5). The stations share studios on Old U.S. Highway 54 in Osage Beach; KRMS-LD's transmitter is located on Osage Ridge Road, also in Osage Beach.

History

On August 26, 2021, Viper Communications (managed by principle owners Ken Kuenzie and Dennis Klautzer) announced in a press release that they had acquired a construction permit from the Federal Communications Commission (FCC) to operate a television station in the Lake of the Ozarks area on channel 32. The company owns KRMS (1150 AM and translators 97.5 FM and 103.3 FM), KRMS-FM (93.5), K254BE (98.7 FM), and K285ER (104.9 FM) in the Lake of the Ozarks area; and KHKU (94.3 FM) in Hanapepe, Hawaii (on the island of Kauai) comanaged by Larry Fuss. The owners shared their excitement to bring the area their first television station and hoped to have it on the air by the end of 2021; pending construction problems.

The programming on the station would be run by KRMS Radio and will offer local news and content; and 4 channels of networks not currently in the area with more to be added at a later date. Viper Communications announced they would start hiring more staff to assist in producing local content. The television station will eventually start using ATSC 3.0 technology to transmit a 4K picture. The owners state, "Since we began, we have always believed in growth and in the people of this area. That's why we invested in bringing the latest technology here."

Programming

All programming is run by KRMS Radio. Programming includes local news and events produced by KRMS; as well as syndicated programming such as Little House on the Prairie, Wake Up America, Xploration Awesome Planet, Bonanza, Ministry Now, and Americana.

Technical information

The station has a  broadcast radius according to a Facebook post released by KRMS Radio. The station uses the same transmitter as KRMS-AM and FM.

Subchannels
The station's digital signal is multiplexed:

References

External links

Television stations in Missouri
Mass media in Missouri
2019 establishments in Missouri
Television channels and stations established in 2019
Camden County, Missouri
Miller County, Missouri
Cozi TV affiliates
YTA TV affiliates
Buzzr affiliates
Classic Reruns TV affiliates
Daystar (TV network) affiliates
WeatherNation TV affiliates
The Country Network affiliates
Low-power television stations in the United States
Columbia